Bleak is an unincorporated community in Fauquier County, Virginia, United States.

Bleak had postal facilities in the early 1900s.

References

Unincorporated communities in Fauquier County, Virginia
Unincorporated communities in Virginia